Cirio Hermoso Santiago (January 18, 1936 – September 26, 2008) was a prolific Filipino film producer, director and writer. He used the screen names Cirio Santiago, Cirio H. Santiago and Leonard Hermes.

Life and career
Santiago was born on January 18, 1936, in Manila, Philippines to Dr. Ciriaco Santiago, the founder of Manila's Premiere Productions, and his wife Adela Hermoso. He had two siblings, Danilo H. Santiago and Digna H. Santiago. He majored in Economics and Marketing at the Ateneo de Manila University.

After starting out as a movie trailer editor and later as a producer of dozens of local films in Tagalog for his father's studio in the 1950s and 1960s, he went on writing scripts for such notable films as National Artist Gerardo de Leóns award-winning Ifugao (1954). Working intensively with de Léon and acclaimed director Eddie Romero on many projects motivated him to finally take over director's chores. His first directorial work was the film Paltik (1955) which went on to be nominated for Best Picture at the 1956 FAMAS Awards.

Very early on, Santiago recognized the potential of producing films for the international market, cast with international actors. With the war drama Cavalry Command (1958), which was shot in English, he made a first timid attempt. However, it would be several years before he was able to establish himself in international productions. His breakthrough came with his collaboration with B-movie king Roger Corman, who was endorsed to him by the U.S. embassy in Manila. For Corman's New World Pictures, Santiago initially served as production supervisor on hits like Big Doll House (1971) with Pam Grier. His first credit as a director for Corman was Savage! (1973) for which he was paid 3,000 USD. The strong business relationship between Corman and Santiago grew into a close friendship over the years. Santiago even became the godfather of Corman's children.

Many more productions for Corman and other U.S. production companies followed soon after including Blaxploitation classics such as TNT Jackson (1975), The Muthers (1976) and Death Force (1978). By the 1980s, Santiago was almost working exclusively on international productions of various genres. A particularly fruitful period was his 3 picture collaboration with West Indian film distributor Anthony Maharaj, during which Santiago often had larger budgets at his disposal resulting in significantly better production values. These films include the First Blood rip-off Final Mission (1984) or the rape-revenge drama Naked Vengeance (1985) that both enjoyed a worldwide theatrical release.

His later career was dominated by war films such as Eye of the Eagle (1987) with Robert Patrick, Firehawk (1993), martial arts action such as Bloodfist (1989, producer), and post-apocalyptic thrillers such as Dune Warriors (1991) with David Carradine, made directly for video, of which his output sometimes peaked at four releases a year. In the late 1990s, with the decline of the video store era, his output dwindled. His final credit is Water Wars (2014). Santiago was forced to leave the set after only three days of shooting and was admitted to the hospital where he died soon after. Jim Wynorski stepped in to finish the project.

Over time, Santiago has had the opportunity to work with numerous U.S. directors notably Jonathan Demme, Joe Dante, Curtis Hanson and Carl Franklin, some of whom made their first experiences at the helm on a Cirio Santiago set.

Other activities
From 1986 to 2001, Santiago held the role of Chairman of the Film Development Foundation of the Philippines. At the time of his death he was also chairman of the Laguna Lake Development Authority.

Death
Cirio Santiago died September 26, 2008, in Makati City, Metro Manila from lung cancer. He left behind his wife Annabelle and his children Christopher, Cathy, Claudine, and Cirio Jr. His third son Cyril died just a few months earlier.

Legacy
Quentin Tarantino counts Santiago among his influences. He owns an extensive collection of Cirio H. Santiago movies and based some of the characters in Kill Bill on Santiago's Death Force (1978).

According to David Renske in his book, Santiago met Steven Spielberg in his mum's L.A. restaurant "The Milky Way" expecting Spielberg wanting to collaborate with him on a project. To Santiago's astonishment, Spielberg merely inquired whether Nam Angels (1989) had really only cost 400,000 USD. Spielberg did, however, offer the film's leading man, Brad Johnson, a considerable role in his romantic drama Always (1989).

Awards and nominations

Filmography

Producer

Operation Balikatan (2003) (producer)
When Eagles Strike (2003) (producer)
Vital Parts (2001) (producer) or Harold Robbins’ Body Parts (USA)
Anak Ng Bulkan (1997) (producer)
Damong Ligaw (1997) (executive producer)
Kadre (1997) (executive producer)
Vulcan (1997) (producer)
Robo Warriors (1996) (executive producer)
Terminal Virus (1995) (TV) (producer) or Last Chance
Angel of Destruction (1994) (producer) or Furious Angel
Caged Heat II: Stripped of Freedom (1994) (producer)
One Man Army (1994) (producer) or Kick & Fury
Stranglehold (1994) (producer)
Ultimatum (1994) (producer)
Angelfist (1993) (producer)
Blackbelt II (1993) (producer) or Blackbelt II: Fatal Force
Firehawk (1993) (V) (producer)
Kill Zone (1993) (producer)
Live by the Fist (1993) (producer)
Blackbelt (1992) (producer) or Black Belt
Beyond the Call of Duty (1992) (producer)
Raiders of the Sun (1992) (producer)
Bloodfist II (1990) (producer)
Dune Warriors (1990) (producer)
Terror in Paradise (1990) (producer)
Bloodfist (1989) (producer)
Eye of the Eagle 2: Inside the Enemy (1989) (producer) or KIA
Silk 2 (1989) (producer)
Spyder (1988) (executive producer)
Demon of Paradise (1987) (producer)
Fast Gun (1987) (producer)
Equalizer 2000 (1986) (producer)
Eye of the Eagle (1986) (producer)
Silk (1986) (producer) or Silk: Lady Dynamite (Philippines)
Naked Vengeance (1985) (producer) or Satin Vengeance
Wheels of Fire (1985) (producer) or Desert Warrior or Pyro or Vindicator
The Devastator (1985) (producer) or Kings Ransom or The Destroyers
Final Mission (1984) (producer) or Last Mission
PX (1984) (producer)
Stryker (1983) (producer) or Savage Dawn
Firecracker (1981) (producer) or Naked Fist
Up from the Depths (1979) (producer)
Modelong Tanso (1979) (producer)
The Muthers (1976) (producer)
Ebony, Ivory & Jade (1976) or She-Devils in Chains, American Beauty Hostages, Foxfire, or Foxforce
Hustler Squad (1976) (producer)
Cover Girl Models (1975) (producer)
TNT Jackson (1975) (producer)
Bamboo Gods and Iron Men (1974) (producer) or Black Kung Fu (USA)
South Seas (1974) (producer) or South Seas Massacre (Australia)
Savage! (1973) (producer) or Black Valor
Fly Me (1973) (producer)
The Big Bird Cage (1972) (producer) or Women’s Penitentiary II
The Hot Box (1972) (producer) or Hell Cats (UK)
Women in Cages (1971) (producer) or Women’s Penitentiary III
The Big Doll House (1971) (producer) or Bamboo Dolls House or Women’s Penitentiary or Women’s Penitentiary III (USA: changed title)
The Arizona Kid (1970) (producer) or Fratelli di Arizona, I (Italy)
El Pinoy Matador (1970)
Kulay Dugo ang Gabi (1966) (producer) or The Blood Drinkers (USA) or The Vampire People (USA)
Man on the Run (1964) (producer) or The Kidnappers
Cavalry Command (1963) (producer) or The Day of the Trumpet

Director

When Eagles Strike (2003)
Aladdin and the Adventure of All Time (1999)
Anak ng Bulkan (1997)
Nagmumurang Kamatis (1997)
Vulcan (1997)
Caged Heat II: Stripped of Freedom (1994) or Caged Heat 2: Stripped of Freedom (USA) or Prisoners
One Man Army (1994) or Kick & Fury
Stranglehold (1994)
Ultimatum (1994)
Angelfist (1993)
Firehawk (1993) (V)
Kill Zone (1993)
Live by the Fist (1993)
Beyond the Call of Duty (1992)
Raiders of the Sun (1992)
Field of Fire (1991)
Dune Warriors (1990)
Last Stand at Lang Me] (1990) or Eye of the Eagle 3
Nam Angels (1989)
Silk 2 (1989)
The Expendables (1988)
The Sisterhood (1988)
Demon of Paradise (1987)
Fast Gun (1987)
Killer Instinct (1987) or Behind Enemy Lines (USA)
Equalizer 2000 (1987)
Eye of the Eagle (1987)
Future Hunters (1986) or Deadly Quest or Spear of Destiny
Silk (1986) detective drama.
Naked Vengeance (1985) or Satin Vengeance
Wheels of Fire (1985) or Desert Warrior or Pyro or Vindicator
The Devastator (1985) or Kings Ransom or The Destroyers
Final Mission (1984) or Last Mission
Caged Fury (1983)
Stryker (1983) or Savage Dawn (video title)
Firecracker (1981) or Naked Fist
Ang Galing-Galing Mo, Mrs. Jones (1980)
Modelong Tanso (1979)
Death Force (1978)
Vampire Hookers (1978)
Hell Hole (1978) or Escape from Women’s Hell Hole (USA) or Women of Hell’s Island
The Muthers (1976)
Ebony, Ivory & Jade (1976) or She-Devils in Chains, American Beauty Hostages, Foxfire, or Foxforce
Cover Girl Models (1975)
Fe, Esperanza, Caridad (1975)
Happy Days Are Here Again (1974)
Carnival Song (1974)
TNT Jackson or Dynamite Wong and TNT Jackson (1974)
Fe, Esperanza, Caridad (with Lamberto V. Avellana and Gerardo de Leon, 1974)
Savage! (1973) or Black Valor
Fly Me (1973)
Once Upon a Time (with Zenaida Amador, 1971)
Lollipops and Roses (1971)
Panagupa (1969)
Operation: Impossible (1967)
Alamid (Agent 777) (1967)
Marko Asintado (1967)
Ang Limbas at ang Lawin (1967)
Tiagong Lundag (1966)
Room 69 (with Gerardo de Leon, 1966)
Wanted: Johnny L (with Cesar J. Amigo, Teodorico C. Santos, Gerardo de Leon and Eddie Romero, 1966)
Kardong Kaliwa (1966)
Pistolero (1966)
Hanapin si Leo Baron (1965)
7 Mukha ni Dr. Ivan (1965)
Darna at ang Babaing Tuod (1965) or Darna and the Tree Monster
Kaaway Bilang Uno (1965)
Scorpio (1964)
Saan Man Sulok ng Daigdig (1964)
Bakas ng Dragon (1964)
Lagalag (1964)
Duwag ang Sumuko (1964)
Ging (1964)
Magnong Mandurukot (1963)
Los Palikeros (1963)
Sa Pagitan ng Dalawang Mata (1963)
The Big Show (1963)
Leon Marahas (1962)
Masikip ang Daigdig (1962)
Walang Susuko (1962)
Mga Yapak na Walang Bakas (1961)
Pitong Gabi sa Paris (1961)
Nagbabagang Lupa (1961)
Konsiyerto ng Kamatayan ("Lumuluhang Bangkay" segment, 1961)
Sa Ibabaw ng Aking Bangkay (1960)
Pagsapit ng Hatinggabi (fourth segment, 1960)
Pautang ng Langit (1960)
Sandakot Na Alabok (1960)
Hawaiian Boy (1959)
Ultimatum (1959)
Pusang Itim (1958)
Laban sa Lahat (1958)
Water Lily (1958)
Pepeng Kaliwete (1958)
Pusakal (1957)
Bicol Express (fourth segment, 1957)
4 Na Kasaysayang Ginto ("30 Sandali" segment, 1956)
Paltik (1954)

Writer
Operation Balikatan (2003) or Where Eagles Strike
Anak ng Bulkan (1997) (story)
Vulcan (1997) (story)
Silk (1986) (story)
Stryker (1983) (story - as Leonard Hermes)
Firecracker (1981) or Naked Fist
Hell Hole (1978) or Escape from Women’s Hell Hole (USA) or Women of Hell’s Island
The Muthers (1976) (story - as Leonard Hermes)

References

External links

1936 births
2008 deaths
Blaxploitation film directors
Deaths from lung cancer in the Philippines
Filipino film directors
People from Manila